Little Pond is a  cold-water pond in Plymouth, Massachusetts. The pond is located in Morton Park, adjacent to Billington Sea. Little Pond is a popular summer swimming spot; a public beach runs along the northern shore of the pond. The pond is stocked with rainbow and brown trout.

External links 
 

Ponds of Plymouth, Massachusetts
Ponds of Massachusetts